Maipú is a city in Mendoza Province, Argentina. It is the capital of the Maipú Department. It is located a short distance from the provincial capital, Mendoza.

Maipú is at the centre of an important wine-growing region, and has a wine museum. It has a population of 89,433.

See also
Mendoza wine

External links
 VISITE MAIPU wine photos service shop weather professional all information of CITY MAIPU

 Municipal website

Gallery

Populated places in Mendoza Province
Cities in Argentina